Allen Clark Lyday (born September 16, 1960) is a former American football defensive back who played for the Houston Oilers of the National Football League. Following his graduation from Wichita South High School in Wichita, Kansas, Lyday first enrolled at Texas Southern University before transferring to the University of Nebraska.

References

Living people
1960 births
Players of American football from Wichita, Kansas
American football defensive backs
African-American players of American football
Texas Southern Tigers football players
Nebraska Cornhuskers football players
Houston Oilers players
21st-century African-American people
20th-century African-American sportspeople